Sanele Vavae Tuilagi (born 15 June 1988) is a Samoan professional rugby player. Sanele is the younger brother of former and current n internationals Henry, Freddie, Alesana, Anitelea Tuilagi and the older brother of  international Manu Tuilagi.

Sanele played for the Samoan National U-20 team in the 2008 IRB Junior World Championship. He also represented Savaii Samoa in the 2010 IRB Pacific Rugby Cup. In 2015, he represented the Samoan national side, making his debut in the opening round of the 2015 World Rugby Pacific Nations Cup against the United States.

Tuilagi played for French club Narbonne in the Rugby Pro D2. He now plays for US Carcassonne and is also playing rugby league for AS Carcassonne in the Elite One Championship.

References

External links
IRB Player Profile
Oceania Rugby Profile

1988 births
Living people
AS Carcassonne players
Expatriate rugby union players in England
Expatriate rugby union players in France
Leicester Tigers players
People from Fa'asaleleaga
RC Narbonne players
Rugby league props
Rugby union number eights
Samoa international rugby union players
Samoan sportspeople
Samoan expatriate rugby union players
Samoan expatriate sportspeople in England
Samoan expatriate sportspeople in France
Samoan rugby league players
Samoan rugby union players
Tuilagi family
US Carcassonne players